New Walk may refer to:

 New Walk, York a promenade beside the Ouse established in 1730
 New Walk, Leicester a thoroughfare in Leicester three-quarters of a mile long stretching from Welford Place to Granville Road, which has been pedestrianised since 1785
 New Walk Museum and art gallery, on New Walk
 New Walk, a poetry and arts magazine, published in Leicester

Leicester